Squaw is an ethnic and sexual slur, historically used for Indigenous North American women. Contemporary usage, especially by non-Natives, is considered offensive, derogatory, racist, and misogynistic.

Squaw may also refer to:

Biology
 Oldsquaw, a former common name in America for Clangula hyemalis, the Long-tailed duck
 Squaw grass, Xerophyllum tenax
 Squaw root, Conopholis americana
 Squaw weed, Senecio aureus
 Squaw tea, the herb Ephedra nevadensis or an herbal tea containing ephedra
 Squawfish, a common name for Ptychocheilus

Places
 Squaw Cap, New Brunswick, Canada
 Squaw Gap, North Dakota, U.S.
 Squaw Hill, California, U.S.
 Squaw Point, a point of land on Gull Lake in Minnesota, U.S.
 Squaw Township, Warren County, Iowa, USA
 Squaw Creek (disambiguation)
 Squaw Island (disambiguation)
 Squaw Lake (disambiguation)
 Squaw Peak (disambiguation)
 Squaw Valley (disambiguation)

Other uses
 McGill Squaws, former name of the women's collegiate sports teams of McGill University, now called McGill Martlets

See also

 Squaw Rapids Airport, Squaw Rapids, Saskatchewan, Canada
 The White Squaw (1956 film), U.S. Western film
 The Squaw Man (disambiguation)